Drungo LaRue Hazewood (September 2, 1959 – July 28, 2013) was an outfielder in Major League Baseball. He played for the Baltimore Orioles in 1980. He spent the majority of his career in the minor leagues, playing for the Class AA Charlotte O's in the 1980s.

Biography
Hazewood was a first round pick, and the nineteenth player selected overall, by Baltimore in 1977. He spent that first season with the rookie-league Bluefield Orioles and was promoted to the Class A Miami Orioles for the 1978 season. In 1979, he hit 21 home runs with the Class AA Charlotte O's of the Southern League.

He made his major league debut in 1980. Despite a .583 batting average during spring training, he only joined the Orioles as a September call-up, appearing in six games and going hitless in five plate appearances with four strikeouts.

In 1981, Hazewood was back in the minor leagues. He struggled in 18 games with the Class AAA Rochester Red Wings, getting 6 hits in 64 at bats. He spent most of the year in Class AA with Charlotte. Hazewood hit .226 with 11 home runs and 28 stolen bases in 1982. In 1983, his last baseball season, Hazewood hit a combined .247 for two minor league teams. He left baseball during that season to take care of his mother, who had been diagnosed with breast cancer.

Hazewood was known as a power hitter who struck out frequently and had difficulty hitting a curveball. He had more strikeouts than hits in every major league and minor league season he played. Former teammates have recalled Hazewood's strength and speed. Cal Ripken Jr. described an incident in which Hazewood had snapped a baseball bat simply by twisting it.

Hazewood died from cancer at his home in South Sacramento, California, on July 28, 2013.  He was 53 years old.

References

External links

1959 births
2013 deaths
African-American baseball players
Baltimore Orioles players
Baseball players from Alabama
Baseball players from Sacramento, California
Bluefield Orioles players
Charlotte O's players
Major League Baseball outfielders
Miami Orioles players
Sportspeople from Mobile, Alabama
Rochester Red Wings players
San Jose Bees players
Deaths from cancer in California
20th-century African-American sportspeople
21st-century African-American people